IC 2955 is an elliptical or a lenticular galaxy located about 300 million light-years away in the constellation Leo. It was discovered by astronomer Guillaume Bigourdan on March 28, 1886. It is a member of the Leo Cluster and is a companion of NGC 3862.

See also 
 NGC 3842
 NGC 3862

References

External links

2955
36603
Leo (constellation)
Leo Cluster
Astronomical objects discovered in 1886
Lenticular galaxies
Elliptical galaxies